Docidium is a genus of algae belonging to the family Desmidiaceae.

The species of this genus are found in Europe and Northern America.

Species:

Docidium baculum 
Docidium baculum 
Docidium dilatatum 
Docidium undulatum

References

Desmidiaceae
Charophyta genera